Mesocetus
is an extinct genus of baleen whale from the Miocene of Europe (Antwerp, Belgium and Balkans).

Description
Mesocetus is similar to other tranatocetids in having rostral bones that override the frontals and contact the parietals, nasals dividing the maxillae on the vertex, a dorsoventrally bent occipital shield with a more horizontal anterior portion and more vertical posterior portion, and a tympanic bulla with short, narrow anterior portion with rounded or squared anterior end and wider and higher posterior portion that is particularly swollen in the posteroventral area. Shared characters with Tranatocetus include posterior ends of premaxillae fused with the maxillae and divided on the vertex by long, narrow and high (vertical plate-like) nasals and cervical vertebrae with wide transverse foramina, almost as wide as the centra.

Species
 Mesocetus agrami Van Beneden, 1886; known from late Miocene (late Serravallian) of the Balkans.
 Mesocetus aquitanicus Flot, 1896
 Mesocetus hungaricus Kadic, 1907
 Mesocetus longirostris van Beneden, 1880 (type);
 Mesocetus pinguis van Beneden, 1880; nomen dubium
 Mesocetus siphunculus Cope, 1895

Formerly assigned to Mesocetus
 Mesocetus latifrons von Beneden, 1880; now referred to Aglaocetus as A. latifrons
 Mesocetus schweinfurthi Fraas 1904a; now referred to Eocetus as E. schweinfurthi
 Mesocetus argillarius Roth, 1978 = Tranatocetus argillarius

References

Prehistoric cetacean genera
Miocene mammals of Europe
Miocene cetaceans